Kamal El-Din Hussein‎ (2 January 1921 – 19 June 1999) was a member of the Egyptian Free Officers who overthrew King Farouk.

Early life and education
Kamal El-Din Hussein was born in 1921 in Banha, Qalyubia. He was admitted to military college in 1937. In 1939 he received the bachelor's degree of military science from military academy. He served in the field artillery unit in the Western Desert, to fight with the British against the advancing army under Rommel in World War II.

Political career
Hussein was a founding member of the Free Officers, and his rank was major during his membership to the group. He was appointed member of the  Egyptian Revolutionary Command Council after the 1952 Revolution. During the presidency of Gamal Abdel Nasser he was named the president of the teachers' syndicate. He was also appointed minister of social affairs in 1954. He was named the minister of education in late 1957 following the elections in October. In February 1958 he submitted his resignation from the ministry of education to Nasser due to the criticisms over the education policies, but it was not accepted by Nasser.

Hussein led the National Guard to defend Ismailia during the Suez War. In 1964 he resigned from his post as vice president and minister of local governments. His main reason was the Egyptian intervention in the Yemen War. During Anwar El-Sadat's presidency he was elected in 1971 to the People's Assembly. After criticizing Sadat's government, he was dismissed from the People's assembly in 1978 and therefore also prevented from further elections. In 1983 he made a tour with Yasser Arafat through Arab countries to end hostilities between different Palestinian factions throughout the Arab world.

Death
Kamal El-Din Hussein was diagnosed with liver cancer. He died on 19 June 1999. His funeral was attended by the then Egyptian president Hosni Mubarak.

References

External links

1999 deaths
1921 births
Egyptian military officers
Egyptian revolutionaries
Members of the House of Representatives (Egypt)
Vice-presidents of Egypt
Deaths from liver cancer
Arab Socialist Union (Egypt) politicians
Free Officers Movement (Egypt)
Deaths from cancer in Egypt
People from Benha
Education Ministers of Egypt